is a 1969 Japanese film directed by Kazuo Ikehiro. It is based on Renzaburō Shibata's novel series Nemuri Kyoshiro. The lead star is Hiroki Matsukata. He played the role of Nemuri Kyoshiro as a replacement for Ichikawa Raizō. In this film Masakazu Tamura played a villain (he later played Nemuri Kyoshiro in the television series and the following five TV specials).

Plot
Source:
Kishiwada clan Senior Vassal Naito Mondo asks Kyōshirō to rape a woman loved by the lord of the Kishiwada clan so that her reputation will be destroyed, as this woman is suspected of being a spy for the Satsuma clan. Kyōshirō agrees and fulfills the request, but also arranges for two Hina Imperial dolls presented to the Kushiwada clan by the Shogunate to be stolen. Later, Kyōshirō is attacked by assassins of the Satsuma clan, but refuses to kill one of them who is a half-breed samurai like Kyōshirō himself. When the Imperial dolls are damaged, Kyōshirō begins a journey to somehow have them repaired and becomes involved in the conflict between the Satsuma and Kishiwada clans as Satsuma assassins continually attempt to kill him.

Cast
Hiroki Matsukata as Nemuri Kyoshiro 
Masakazu Tamura as Umezu Ichirota
Yoko Minamikawa as Rei
Kikko Matsuoka as Chisa
Ichirō Nakatani as Benjiro Okumura
Seiichiro Kameishi as Okabe
Yoshi Katō as Toen
Yasuhiro Minakami as Ryoma
Asao Uchida as Toda Suishin

References

External links

Jidaigeki films
Samurai films
Daiei Film films
1960s Japanese films